Saigonita is a monotypic moth genus of the family Noctuidae. Its only species, Saigonita paradoxa, is found in Vietnam. Both the genus and species were first described by Sergius G. Kiriakoff in 1971.

References

Agaristinae
Monotypic moth genera